The 2015 GP Miguel Induráin was the 62nd edition of the GP Miguel Induráin cycle race and was held on 4 April 2015. The race started and finished in Estella. The race was won by Ángel Vicioso.

Results

References

External links

2015
2015 UCI Europe Tour
2015 in Spanish road cycling